Aleksandr Syrei (born 26 August 1988 in Grodno, Byelorussian SSR, Soviet Union) is a Belarusian professional ice hockey defenceman. He currently plays for Shakhtar Soligorsk of the Belarusian Extraliga. Syrei began his professional career with HK Gomel of the Eastern European Hockey League's Division B and played with that organization for five seasons.

Syrei previously represented Belarus at the 2004, 2005, and 2006 IIHF World U18 Championships, and the 2007 World Junior Ice Hockey Championships.

Career statistics

Regular season and playoffs

International

External links
 

1988 births
Sportspeople from Grodno
Belarusian ice hockey defencemen
Living people
Podhale Nowy Targ players